This article refers to crime in the U.S. state of North Carolina.

Statistics
In 2008 there were 415,810 crimes reported in North Carolina, including 605 murders. In 2014 there were 318,464 crimes reported, including 510 murders.

Between 2003 and 2012, there were an average of 15,255 vehicle thefts per year in North Carolina.

Policing

In 2008, North Carolina had 504 state and local law enforcement agencies. Those agencies employed a total of 35,140 staff. Of the total staff, 23,442 were sworn officers (defined as those with general arrest powers).

Police ratio 

In 2008, North Carolina had 380 police officers per 100,000 residents, in which 254 are sworn officers.

Capital punishment laws

Capital punishment is applied in this state.

See also 
 Law of North Carolina

References